Henry Ernest McDaniel  (September 10, 1867 – January 24, 1948) was an American Hall of Fame and national Champion trainer of Thoroughbred racehorses. He was the brother of trainer William Lee McDaniel. Their father was the prominent New Jersey trainer Col. David McDaniel who won three straight editions of the Belmont Stakes and who bred horses at his Stony Brook stud farm at Princeton, New Jersey.

In a career that spanned 64 years (1884-1947), the most famous of the horses Henry McDaniel trained was Exterminator, winner of the 1918 Kentucky Derby and an American Horse of the Year honoree as well as Champion Older Horse three times. With Hurryoff, McDaniel won  the 1933 Belmont Stakes, a race that would become the third leg of the U. S. Triple Crown series.

One of the most sought after trainers of his generation, Henry McDaniel was hired by major industry figures such as Lucky Baldwin, Gifford A. Cochran, F. Ambrose Clark, Robert T. Davies,  Hope Goddard Iselin, Willis Sharpe Kilmer, J. K. L. Ross, Walter P. Chrysler Jr., Robert T. Davies and Joseph E. Widener.

Henry McDaniel died at a hospital in Coral Gables, Florida on January 24, 1948, at age 80. He was buried next to his wife Leonora in the Forest Home Cemetery in Chicago.

Following its formation, Henry McDaniel was inducted in the United States' National Museum of Racing and Hall of Fame in 1956.

References

External links
 Henry McDaniel at Find A Grave Memorial # 107515101
 Here Comes Exterminator! by Eliza McGraw

1867 births
1948 deaths
American Champion racehorse trainers
United States Thoroughbred Racing Hall of Fame inductees
People from Secaucus, New Jersey
Burials at Forest Home Cemetery, Chicago